Ilex marahuacae is a species of plant in the family Aquifoliaceae. It is endemic to Venezuela.

References

marahuacae
Endemic flora of Venezuela
Near threatened flora of South America
Taxonomy articles created by Polbot